Buildout is an open-source software build tool. Buildout is created using the Python programming language.  It implements a principle of separation of configuration from the scripts that do the setting up.
Buildout is primarily used to download and set up dependencies in Python eggs format of the software being developed or deployed.  Recipes for build tasks in any environment can be created, and many are already available.

Major features
 Configuration files are INI format
 Support for setuptools and eggs
 Plugin support through Buildout recipes

Sample configuration
  [buildout]
  develop = .
  parts = test

  [test]
  recipe = zc.recipe.testrunner
  eggs = theegg

Notable applications
Grok
Plone
Zope

See also
List of build automation software

References

External links

Python Package Index page
Developing Django apps with zc.buildout by Jacob Kaplan-Moss

Compiling tools
Build automation
Free software programmed in Python